Anastasija Sevastova (born 13 April 1990) is an inactive professional tennis player from Latvia. She reached her career-high singles ranking of world No. 11 in October 2018, after reaching her first Premier Mandatory final at the China Open. She has won four singles titles on the WTA Tour, as well as 13 singles and four doubles titles on the ITF Circuit.

Sevastova is best known for her success at the US Open, particularly in recent years. In 2016, she defeated the reigning French Open champion and world No. 3, Garbiñe Muguruza, as well as Australian Open semifinalist Johanna Konta, en route to her first Grand Slam quarterfinal. In 2018, she reached her first Grand Slam semifinal, defeating defending champion and world No. 3, Sloane Stephens (whom she had lost to at that same stage in 2017), in the quarterfinals, before losing to Serena Williams.

Early life and background
Anastasija Sevastova was born on 13 April 1990 in Liepāja, Latvia. She was raised by her mother Diāna Golovanova, an English teacher. Sevastova's grandmother was interested in channeling Sevastova's energy into sports. She introduced her to the tennis at age 6. With her natural athleticism, Sevastova could have gravitated to basketball or soccer but chose tennis because her grandmother had friends who played and because the family lived near a tennis club in Liepāja.

The colder months would prove more complicated. There were no indoor tennis-dedicated facilities in Liepāja — only school gymnasiums with varnished wooden floors, where the multicolored lines used for various sports intersect like a Mondrian painting. Due to that, Sevastova played most of her winter tennis in the gymnasium in a secondary school where her mother taught. It is also the same school where Jeļena Ostapenko's mother and primary coach, Jeļena Jakovleva, attended school as a youngster.

It soon became clear that Sevastova would need to leave home to progress further. Ernests Gulbis, who was from an affluent family in Riga, was boarding at Niki Pilić's tennis academy in Munich, where a teenage Novak Djokovic was also training. Sevastova eventually followed the same path at age 14, returning regularly to Latvia to complete her schooling. At the same age, she won the Latvian under-18 championships.

Professional career

2006–13: First WTA title, top 100, first retirement

Sevastova began playing on the ITF Women's Circuit in April 2006, nearly before she turned 16. In July of the same year, she reached her first ITF final at the $10k event in Garching and then nearly after that won her first title in Bad Saulgau. In 2007, she made her WTA Tour debut at the İstanbul Cup where she also recorded her first WTA Tour match-win, beating Anastasiya Yakimova, before she was knocked out by fifth-seeded Alona Bondarenko in the next round. At the 2009 French Open, she made her Grand Slam debut and then at the 2009 US Open she won her first Grand Slam match, defeating Tamarine Tanasugarn. By then end of the year, she first entered top 100 in July, and she then reached her first WTA singles quarterfinal at the Guangzhou Open.

The following year, Sevastova got one of the bigger wins of her early career by defeating world No. 9, Jelena Janković in the first round of the 2010 Monterrey Open and then reached the semifinals, losing there to Anastasia Pavlyuchenkova. Following week, she reached third round of the Indian Wells Open, defeating Ana Ivanovic in the second round, before she lost later to Vera Zvonareva. In May, she reached her first WTA singles final at the Estoril Open, where she got the title, beating Arantxa Parra Santonja in straight sets. By the end of the year, she reached four quarterfinals on the WTA Tour, including the one at the Premier Mandatory China Open. Sevastova had a strong start to 2011, reaching round of 16 at the Australian Open, losing there to world No. 1, Caroline Wozniacki, in straight sets. As a result of her progress, she continued to rise on the ranking, getting into the top 40 after Australian Open. She then started to struggle with form, which caused dropping in rankings and also returning to play mostly on the ITF Circuit in 2012. Due to illness and injuries that she faced in the past couple of years, Sevastova announced her retirement from the tour in May 2013.

2015–17: Successful return, US Open quarterfinals, top 15, second WTA title

In January 2015, Sevastova returned to professional tennis, receiving a wildcard into the $10k event in Sharm El Sheikh, where she also won the title. She continued with great results at the following ITF tournaments, before she returned to the WTA Tour at the Nuremberg Cup. Following week, she reached semifinal at the Brasil Tennis Cup, losing there to Teliana Pereira. Later in October, she reached the quarterfinals of the Kremlin Cup in Moscow; she upset Karolína Plíšková in the second round and then lost to eventual champion, Svetlana Kuznetsova, in three sets.

Sevastova made her return to a Grand Slam tournaments in the main draw at the 2016 Australian Open, losing to Ana Ivanovic in the second round. She followed this with quarterfinal of the Taiwan Open, where she lost to Venus Williams. Things became better on the grass-court Mallorca Open where she lost the final to Caroline Garcia, and then month later, she lost clay-court Bucharest Open to Simona Halep. Her most recognisable performance came at the US Open, where she stunned Garbiñe Muguruza in the second round in straight sets, followed with wins over Kateryna Bondarenko and Johanna Konta, reaching her first Grand Slam quarterfinal. However, she was defeated by Caroline Wozniacki, eclipsing a new high ranking of No. 36, on 31 January 2011.

Sevastova was improving more as 2017 season went by. She reached the third round of the Australian Open, beating Nao Hibino and Kristína Kučová, before losing to Garbiñe Muguruza. She then made into her first Premier-5 semifinal at the Dubai Championships, losing there to Caroline Wozniacki, in straight sets. She had strong start at the clay season, reaching two quarterfinals, at the Charleston Open and Stuttgart Open. In Stuttgart, she also recorded her first top-ten win of the year, defeating Johanna Konta in the second round. She then reached her first Premier Mandatory semifinal at the Madrid Open, being then eliminated by Simona Halep. There, she recorded her second top-ten win in 2017, beating world No. 3, Karolína Plíšková, in the second round, in straight sets. Sevastova claimed her first WTA title since 2010, winning Mallorca Open, where she also had reached final the previous year. In the final, she defeated Julia Görges in three sets. Following Wimbledon, where she reached only second round, Sevastova reached No. 17 in the singles rankings, and two quarterfinal appearances at the Bucharest Open and Swedish Open. At the US Tour, she reached third round of the Cincinnati Open, losing there to Simona Halep. She followed this up with her second consecutive US Open quarterfinal, winning her first three rounds easily in straight sets and defeating Maria Sharapova in the fourth round, before losing to eventual champion, Sloane Stephens. Sevastova debuted at the year-end Elite Trophy in Zhuhai. As the winner of her round-robin group, defeating Sloane Stephens and Barbora Strýcová, she lost to Julia Görges in the semifinals.

2018: Third WTA title; first Grand Slam semifinal and first Mandatory final

Sevastova continued to progress with both rankings and results. She had a strong start into the 2018 season at the Brisbane International, where she lost in the semifinals to qualifier Aliaksandra Sasnovich. Sevastova then was eliminated early at the Australian Open, reaching only second round losing to Maria Sharapova, as well as to Simona Halep in the third round of the Qatar Open. Sevastova then made her best results at the Miami Open and Indian Wells Open. In Indian Wells, she defeated Monica Puig and Julia Görges, before losing to Venus Williams in the fourth round, while in Miami, she defeated Alizé Cornet and lost to Victoria Azarenka in the third round. At the Charleston Open she reached semifinals, and lost to Julia Görges.

Despite being eliminated in the early rounds at prominent clay-court tournaments including the Madrid Open, Italian Open and French Open, Sevastova had strong start of grass-court season. She reached the final of the Mallorca Open as the defending champion, but lost there to Tatjana Maria. After the first-round loss at the Wimbledon, she returned to clay courts in July, and made it into the final of the Bucharest Open, defeating Petra Martić in straight sets to win her third WTA title.

Her best performance of the season came at the US Open Series. First, she reached quarterfinals at the Premier 5 Canadian Open, losing there to Sloane Stephens. At the US Open, Sevastova defeated Donna Vekić, Claire Liu, Ekaterina Makarova and seventh seed Elina Svitolina to reach her third consecutive quarterfinal at the tournament. In the quarterfinals, she defeated defending champion Sloane Stephens in straight sets to reach her first major semifinal, where she lost to 23-time Grand Slam champion Serena Williams, in straight sets. In October, Sevastova reached the final of the Premier Mandatory China Open, defeating Donna Vekić, Dominika Cibulková and Naomi Osaka. She lost to Caroline Wozniacki in straight sets but after the tournament, she reached world No. 12 in the rankings and then, a week later, she made her career-high ranking as world No. 11. By the end of the year, she reached semifinals at the Kremlin Cup, losing there to qualifier Ons Jabeur. At the WTA Elite Trophy, she stayed in round-robin group, defeating Zhang Shuai and losing to Garbiñe Muguruza.

2019–22: Variable results and career hiatus

Sevastova varied with results during 2019. She started her year off at the Brisbane International with a quarterfinal loss to world No. 5, Naomi Osaka, in three sets. She then went to the Australian Open and made her first second week at the event since 2011. She beat Mona Barthel, Bianca Andreescu and Wang Qiang in first three rounds and then lost to the eventual champion, Naomi Osaka. Sevastova then had a slump, partly due to injuries and resulted in early losses at the Qatar Open, Dubai Championships, Indian Wells Open and Miami Open. In April, she entered the quarterfinals at the Stuttgart Open after wins over Jeļena Ostapenko and Laura Siegemund. She then faced top-5 player Petra Kvitová, but lost in three sets. Following this, she reached the third round of the Madrid Open but failed in the first round at the Italian Open. At the French Open, for the first time, she made into the second week. During tournament, she saved five match points in her third-round match against Elise Mertens, but lost to Markéta Vondroušová in the fourth round. Sevastova began her grass-court season with semifinal at the Mallorca Open, failing to reached her fourth consecutive final in a row. After the early elimination at Wimbledon, Sevastova would bounce back and claim what she called her most cherished title. She won the inaugural event in Latvia, the Baltic Open in Jūrmala. After the third-round loss at the US Open, Sevastova dropped out the top 20 and did not make any significant results by the end of the year.

Despite the fact season of 2020 was specific due to six months absence of the WTA Tour caused by COVID-19 pandemic, Sevastova only passed first round at the US Open, defeating Coco Gauff in three sets. As the year went by, Sevastova was dropping out the top 50 for the first time since August 2016.

In February 2022, Sevastova announced that she was taking an indefinite break from her tennis career.

National representation
Sevastova played for Latvia in the 2018 Fed Cup. After she, alongside teammates Jeļena Ostapenko, Diāna Marcinkēviča and Daniela Vismane helped Latvia win all three of its ties in the zonal group round-robin phase, and defeat Serbia in the zonal group playoffs, Latvia advanced to the World Group II playoffs, where they played Russia. Despite Sevastova dropping her first match to Anastasia Pavlyuchenkova, Ostapenko won both of her singles rubbers, and after Sevastova defeated Ekaterina Makarova in the final singles rubber, Latvia advanced to World Group II.

Playing style
Sevastova is a tactical, all-round player who uses varied shots to win points. She is also aggressive on the baseline. She possesses consistent and accurate groundstrokes, with both wings capable of producing winners. She has an accurate serve that can reach . She also moves around the court well, and has good footwork. She may approach the net to finish points, and some of her best shots are her drop shots and slices. She can generate a lot of spin on both her forehand and backhand. She states that her backhand is her favourite shot. Possibly her biggest asset is her variety and resilience on court. She stated her favorite surfaces are hardcourt and clay.

Endorsements
She is sponsored by Yonex for her racquets and clothing. She uses the Yonex Ezone DR 98 racquet.

Personal life
Besides Latvian, she speaks English, Russian and German. During her growing up, she enjoyed watching Steffi Graf and Andre Agassi. Her favorite tournaments are Roland Garros, US Open, Mallorca Open and Bucharest Open. She went into retirement in May 2013 but returned in January 2015. She studied leisure management in Austria during her retirement. Her body started feeling better by end of 2014 so decided to give it another shot. She explained her retirement:

Career statistics

Grand Slam singles performance timelines

References

External links

 
 
 
 
 
 
 

1990 births
Living people
Latvian female tennis players
Sportspeople from Liepāja
Latvian people of Russian descent
Olympic tennis players of Latvia
Tennis players at the 2020 Summer Olympics